Pauline Ranvier (born 14 April 1994) is a French right-handed foil fencer and 2021 team Olympic silver medalist.

Medal Record

Olympic Games

World Championship

European Championship

World Cup

References

External links

1994 births
Living people
Fencers from Paris
French female foil fencers
Fencers at the 2020 Summer Olympics
Olympic fencers of France
Medalists at the 2020 Summer Olympics
Olympic medalists in fencing
Olympic silver medalists for France
21st-century French women
World Fencing Championships medalists